The Embassy of Mexico in Washington, D.C. houses the diplomatic mission from Mexico to the United States.

Location 
The Embassy located at 1911 Pennsylvania Avenue NW, in the Foggy Bottom neighborhood of Washington, D.C.

Prior to this, from 1921–1989, the Embassy was located in MacVeagh House on 16th Street. The Government of Mexico purchased the House for $330,000 and immediately added a chancery wing to meet its function as an Embassy. However, by the mid 80s the number of staff had grown and the house could no longer accommodate the Embassy comfortably. The Embassy was moved to its current location, albeit without its consular division, which stayed at the MacVeagh House. In 1990, the  Mexican Cultural Institute was also moved into the building.

The building that the Embassy now occupies was designed by architect Peter Vercelli and built in 1986. The building incorporates the façades of the last two remaining of the Seven Buildings–some of the oldest residential structures in Washington, D.C.

Ambassador

The Ambassador of Mexico to the United States is the highest ranking diplomatic representative of the United Mexican States to the United States of America and hold the rank of "ambassador extraordinary and plenipotentiary." The following is a list of Mexican ambassadors since 2006:

 Under President Felipe Calderón Hinojosa (2006 – 2012)
 2006 – 2012: Arturo Sarukhan
 Under President Enrique Peña Nieto (2012 – 2018)
 2012 – 2015: Eduardo Medina-Mora Icaza
 2015 – 2016: Miguel Basáñez Ebergenyi
 2016 – 2017: Carlos Manuel Sada Solana
 2017 – 2018: Gerónimo Gutiérrez Fernández
 Under President Andrés Manuel López Obrador (2018 – Present)
 2019 – 2020: Martha Bárcena Coqui
 2021 – Present: Esteban Moctezuma Barragán

Embassy sections 

The Embassy exercises a number of functions in its representation to the Government of the United States, including political, administrative, economic, public diplomacy, and consular affairs, that are managed by officials from the Secretariat of Foreign Affairs:

 Office of the Ambassador
 Office of the Chief of the Chancellery
 Office of Political Affairs
 Office of Congressional Relations
 Office of Protocol 
 Office of the Press and Media
 Office of Legal Affairs
 Office of Communication and Public Diplomacy
 Office of Economic Affairs
 Office of Hispanic and Migratory Affairs
 Office of Border and Special Affairs
 Office of Administrative Affairs
 Office of Management
 Office of Archives
 IT office
 Mexican Cultural Institute

The consular division of the Embassy is not housed at the chancery, and is instead located in a building on 23rd Street NW.

Consulates 
Mexico also maintains 21 consulates general and 30 consulates across the United States and its territories.

Consulates-General

Consulates

See also 
Ambassador of Mexico to the United States
Embassy of the United States, Mexico City
Foreign relations of Mexico
List of diplomatic missions of Mexico
Mexican Secretariat of Foreign Affairs
Mexico–United States relations
United States Ambassador to Mexico

References

External links 
Mexican Ministry of Foreign Affairs
Embassy of Mexico in Washington, DC (in English and Spanish)

 

Washington
Mexico
Mexican Embassy
Foggy Bottom